Abdul Baseer Nazim is a citizen of Afghanistan who is still held in extrajudicial detention after being transferred from United States Guantanamo Bay detainment camps, in Cuba — to an Afghan prison.

American intelligence analysts estimate that Jan was born in 1980, in Koozbia, Afghanistan. The Department of Defense assigned him the Internment Serial Number 945.

Combatant Status Review 

Jan chose to participate in his Combatant Status Review Tribunal.

A Summary of Evidence memo was prepared for
Said Amir Jan
Combatant Status Review Tribunal,
on 22 December 2004.
The memo listed the following allegations against him:

Administrative Review Board hearing

Detainees who were determined to have been properly classified as "enemy combatants" were scheduled to have their dossier reviewed at annual Administrative Review Board hearings.  The Administrative Review Boards were not authorized to review whether a detainee qualified for POW status, and they were not authorized to review whether a detainee should have been classified as an "enemy combatant".

They were authorized to consider whether a detainee should continue to be detained by the United States, because they continued to pose a threat—or whether they could safely be repatriated to the custody of their home country, or whether they could be set free.

Jan chose to participate in his Administrative Review Board hearing.

The following primary factors favor continued detention

The following primary factors favor release of transfer

Transfer to Afghan prison
He was transferred to an Afghan prison on September 28, 2007, along with five others who were repatriated — 5 Afghans,
a Libyan captive and a Yemeni captive.

The Center for Constitutional Rights reports that all of the Afghans repatriated to Afghanistan from April 2007 were sent to Afghan custody in the American built and supervised wing of the Pul-e-Charkhi prison near Kabul.

References

External links
 The Guantánamo Files: Website Extras (12) – The Last of the Afghans (Part Two) Andy Worthington

Guantanamo detainees known to have been transferred and never released
Afghan extrajudicial prisoners of the United States
1980s births
Living people
Block D, Pul-e-Charkhi prison
Year of birth uncertain